Panther Valley School District is a midsized, suburban public school district which is split across two counties in Pennsylvania. Panther Valley School District serves students who reside in boroughs of Coaldale in Schuylkill County, Lansford, Nesquehoning, and Summit Hill in Carbon County. According to 2000 federal census data, the district serves a resident population of 12,516. In 2009, the district residents’ per capita income was $16,533 while the median family income was $39,133. In the Commonwealth, the median family income was $49,501 and the United States median family income was $49,445, in 2010.

The district operates three schools: Panther Valley High School, Panther Valley Middle School and Panther Valley Elementary School.

Extracurriculars
The district offers a wide variety of clubs, activities and after-school sports.

Athletics 
Panther Valley is assigned to the Pennsylvania interscholastic Athletics Association (PIAA) District 11.

Panther Valley funds teams in the following high school sports:

Football boys
Volleyball Girls
Basketball Boys and girls
Baseball Boys
Softball Girls
Cheerleading Girls
Wrestling Boys
Track and field Boys and Girls

The district also funds the following middle school sports
Basketball boys and girls
Football boys
Track and field boys and girls
Wrestling boys
According to PIAA directory July 2012

References

External links 
 Panther Valley School District Official Web Site
 Panther Valley School District AYP Report 2006-2007
 http://www.openpagov.org
 Pennsylvania Department of Education

School districts established in 1964
School districts in Carbon County, Pennsylvania
School districts in Schuylkill County, Pennsylvania
1964 establishments in Pennsylvania